Below is list of achievements of, and records and trophies won by Beşiktaş J.K.

Championships

League championships (Regional and all tiers Included)

Turkish Super League
Winners (16):  1956–57, 1957–58, 1959–60, 1965–66, 1966–67, 1981–82, 1985–86, 1989–90, 1990–91, 1991–92, 1994–95, 2002–03, 2008–09, 2015–16, 2016–17, 2020–21
Runners-up (14):  1962–63, 1963–64, 1964–65, 1967–68, 1973–74, 1983–84, 1986–87, 1987–88, 1988–89, 1992–93, 1996–97, 1998–99, 1999–2000, 2006–07
Third Place (12): 1959, 1961, 1962, 1969, 1996, 2002, 2004, 2006, 2008, 2013, 2014, 2015
 Turkish National Division
 Winners (3): 1941, 1944, 1947
 Runners-up (3): 1938, 1945, 1946
 Turkish Football Championship
 Winners (2): 1934, 1951
 Runners-up (2): 1941, 1946
Istanbul Football League 
Winners (13): 1923–24, 1933–34, 1938–39, 1939–40, 1940–41, 1941–42, 1942–43, 1944–45, 1945–46, 1949–50, 1950–51, 1951–52, 1953–54
Runners-up (6): 1933, 1944, 1948, 1949, 1953, 1955

Domestic cups (regional, friendly and all tiers included)

Turkish Cup
Winners (10):' 1975, 1989, 1990, 1994, 1998, 2006, 2007, 2009, 2011, 2021
Runners-up (6): 1966, 1977, 1984, 1993, 1999, 2002
Turkish Super Cup 
Winners (2):' 2006, 2021
Runners-up (4): 2007, 2009, 2016, 2017
Turkish Presidents Cup
Winners (7): 1967, 1974, 1986, 1989, 1992, 1994, 1998
Runners-up (7): 1966, 1975, 1977, 1990, 1991, 1993, 1995
Chancellor Cup
Winners (6): 1944, 1947, 1974, 1977, 1988, 1997
Runners-up (1): 1996
TSYD Cup (Shared Record)
Winners (12): 1965, 1966, 1972, 1973, 1975, 1984, 1985, 1989, 1990, 1991, 1994, 1997
Atatürk Cup
Winners (1): 2000
Runners-up (2): 1964, 1998
Istanbul Cup (Shared Record)
Winners (2): 1944, 1946
Istanbul Shield
Winners (1): 1935
Spor-Toto Cup (Record)
Winners (4): 1966, 1968, 1969, 1970
Fleet Cup
Winners (1): 1986
İstanbul SİD Cup
Winners (1): 1935Aviation CupWinners (1): 1938İzmir Fair CupWinners (1): 1943Police Association CupWinners (1): 1982Ali Sami Yen-Şeref Bey CupWinners (1): 1963Victory CupWinners (1): 1953Alpen CupWinners (1): 2004Efes CupWinners (1): 2006Soma TournamentWinners (1): 2014Royal CupWinners (1): 2015

League participationİstanbul Sports League: 1920, 1921İstanbul Football League: 1924, 1925, 1926, 1927, 1928, 1929, 1930, 1931, 1932, 1933, 1934, 1935, 1936, 1937, 1938, 1939, 1940, 1941, 1942, 1943, 1944, 1946, 1947, 1948, 1949, 1950, 1951, 1952, 1953, 1954, 1955, 1956, 1957, 1958, 1959National League 1937, 1938, 1939, 1940, 1941, 1943, 1944, 1945, 1946, 1947, 1950 Turkish First Football League: 1957, 1958, 1959, 1960, 1961, 1962, 1963, 1964, 1965, 1966, 1967, 1968, 1969, 1970, 1971, 1972, 1973, 1973, 1974, 1975, 1976, 1977, 1978, 1979, 1980, 1981, 1982, 1983, 1984, 1985, 1986, 1987, 1988, 1989, 1990, 1991, 1992, 1993, 1994, 1995, 1996, 1997, 1998, 1999, 2000, 2001, 2002, 2003, 2004, 2005, 2006, 2007, 2008, 2009, 2010, 2011, 2012, 2013, 2014, 2015, 2016, 2017, 2018,2019,2020UEFA Champions League: 1958*, 1959, 1961, 1967, 1968, 1983, 1987, 1991, 1992, 1993, 1996, 2004, 2008, 2010, 2017, 2018, 2022

European achievementsPos. = Position; Pld = Matches played; W = Won; D = Drawn; L = Lost; GF = Goals for; GA = Goals against; Pa. = Participation; Pld = Matches playedSCUP = UEFA Super Cup; ECCC / UCL = European Champion Clubs' Cup / UEFA Champions League; UCWC = UEFA Cup Winners' Cup;UCUP = UEFA Cup (including Inter-Cities Fairs Cup); UIC' = UEFA Intertoto Cup

Best campaigns

Records and statistics

Records
 Only club to win the Istanbul Football League five seasons in a row (1939–1943).
 Most goals scored in Istanbul League, 90 goals in a season, 599 in 8 seasons.
 Only team to start the season with 13 straight wins.
 The only undefeated champion of the Turkish Super League (1992).
 Most games won in a row (18).
 First club to win the Turkish Super Cup (1–0 against Galatasaray).
 Biggest win ever in the Turkish Super League (10–0 against Adana Demirspor).

Statistics
 Biggest win: Beşiktaş 10–0 Adana Demirspor
 Biggest loss: Liverpool 8–0 Beşiktaş
 First International match: Real Madrid 2–0 Beşiktaş

Achievements
Major achievements listed by official club website:
The only undefeated winner of the Süper Lig (1991–92 season)
Biggest win ever in the Süper Lig against Adana Demirspor with 10–0 during the 1989–90 season. Goals by Ali Gültiken (4), Metin Tekin (3) ve Feyyaz Uçar (3)
Longest streak of undefeated games in the Süper Lig with 56 games, hence the nickname Yenilmez Armada'' (Invincible Armada)
10 seasons unbeaten at home against teams from outside of Istanbul in the Süper Lig (with the exception of rival Istanbul teams Fenerbahçe and Galatasaray)
Most games won in a row by any club in the Süper Lig with 18 games
Won 5 consecutive Istanbul League titles (1939–1943)
Most goals scored in the Istanbul League, 90 goals in a season, 599 in 8 seasons
First winner of the Turkish Super Cup in 2006 against Galatasaray, 1–0
The record away win in a UEFA competition match in the club's history was against FK Olimpik Sarajevo with 0–5 during the 2002–03 UEFA Cup
Most winner of the Istanbul Football League title (15)
Only club to win the Istanbul Football League title 5 times in a row (1939–1943)
Most goals scored in Istanbul League history (90 Goals in a season, 599 Goals in 8 seasons)
Highest number of undefeated titles (7)
Only team that won the Turkish National League Championship with a perfect record
Only team selected to represent the Turkey national football team
Only team to carry a Turkish Flag on its Emblem
Most winner of the ‘Fair-Play’ Cup (19)
Most winner of the Istanbul and Turkish titles in the youth leagues (30)
Only football club with a title in fencing (Balkan Championship)
Only Turkish club to help legitimize Commemoration of Atatürk, Youth and Sports Day
Only  club that introduced Greco-Roman wrestling to other clubs in Turkey
Only Turkish club that have titles in athletics, fencing, boxing, basketball, wrestling and football.
Only club that introduced pole vault to Turkey (Painter Namik Ismail)
The club that teach physical education at schools
Owner of Turkey’s greatest sports facilities
Only club with “sports schools” in almost every sports section
The team that has raised the highest number of talented players from their youth organization
 Only team with a 56-match unbeaten streak
Most consecutive wins in football tournaments (18)
The team that posted only one loss in two seasons
Biggest defeat in UEFA Champions League history against Liverpool F.C., 8-0; in the group stage 2007-08.
The team with the longest unbeaten streak in league history (48 matches). After losing 2–0 to Gençlerbirliği in Week 26 of the 1991-92 season, the Black and White's did not lose a match until a 3–1 setback against Galatasaray in Week 13 of the following season, a span of 48 weeks.
Most consecutive wins in National Football League Championship (13) (1959–60)
In comparison to other clubs, which mostly have ISO 9001:1994, Beşiktaş is the first Turkish sports club to receive ISO 9001: 2000 certification through highly efficient sports departments and facilities management, advanced marketing and selling of club products and modern  press, public and fan communications services.

References

External links
 Official website 
 Statistics

Beşiktaş J.K.